APEC Indonesia 1994 was a series of Asia-Pacific Economic Cooperation meetings focused on economic cooperation, held at the Bogor Palace in Bogor, West Java, Indonesia on 15–16 November 1994. It was the seventh APEC meeting in history and the first held in the Indonesia.

Results 
The meeting adopted "the long-term goal of free and open trade and investment in the Asia-Pacific", that has been called the "Bogor Goals". It is one of APEC's flagship initiatives.

References 

1994
1994 in economics
Economy of Indonesia
Diplomatic conferences in Indonesia
20th-century diplomatic conferences
1994 in international relations
1994 conferences
1994 in Indonesia
November 1994 events in Asia